Peter Doohan (2 May 1961 – 21 July 2017) was an Australian tennis player who won three consecutive Australian Hard Court Championships singles titles (1984, 1985, 1986), which remains an Open era record for that tournament. He won a further two singles titles at the South Australian Open in 1984 and San Louis Potosi tournament in Mexico in 1988. He also won five doubles titles during his career. The right-hander reached his highest Association of Tennis Professionals (ATP) singles ranking of world No. 43 in August 1987.

Career
At the 1987 Wimbledon Championships, he unexpectedly defeated two-time defending champion and top-seeded Boris Becker in the second round, earning himself the nickname "The Becker Wrecker" at home in Australia.

Doohan played collegiately in the United States with the University of Arkansas where he won the NCAA doubles title in 1982. Also a successful singles player, he won three Australian Hard Court Championships consecutively from (1984–1986). In 1984, he won the South Australian Open singles title. In 1988, he won the San Louis Potosi singles title on clay in San Luis Potosí, Mexico. He also coached high school tennis at Donoho High School in Anniston, Alabama, for several years in the mid-1990s.

Doohan died on 21 July 2017 from motor neurone disease.

Grand Slam finals

Doubles: 1 (1 runner-up)

ATP career finals

Singles: 4 (1 title, 3 runner-ups)

Doubles: 14 (5 titles, 9 runner-ups)

ATP Challenger and ITF Futures finals

Singles: 1 (0–1)

Doubles: 1 (1–0)

Performance timelines

Singles

Doubles

Mixed Doubles

References

External links
 
 
 
 

1961 births
2017 deaths
Arkansas Razorbacks men's tennis players
Australian expatriate sportspeople in the United States
Australian male tennis players
People from Newcastle, New South Wales
Tennis people from New South Wales
Neurological disease deaths in New South Wales
Deaths from motor neuron disease
20th-century Australian people
21st-century Australian people
Place of death missing